Expeditionary Force may refer to:

 Expeditionary warfare, a military force dispatched to fight in a foreign country
 Expeditionary Force, a science fiction book series by Craig Alanson

Military formations with Expeditionary Force in their name include:

American Expeditionary Forces: to France (1917–1919)
American North Russia Expeditionary Force (1918–1919)
Australian Naval and Military Expeditionary Force: To German New Guinea (1914)
First Australian Imperial Force: (1914–1919)
Second Australian Imperial Force: (1939-1945)
Brazilian Expeditionary Force: to Italy (1943–1945)
British Expeditionary Force (World War I): to France and Belgium (1914–1918)
British Expeditionary Force (World War II): to France and Belgium (1939–1940)
Canadian Expeditionary Force: to France and Belgium (1914–1920)
Chilean Expeditionary Force in War of the Pacific (1879–1883)
Chinese Expeditionary Force: to Burma and India (1942–1945)
Combined Joint Expeditionary Force (2010–present)
Corps expeditionnaire d'Orient: to Gallipoli (1915–1916)
Egyptian Expeditionary Force: British in Egypt, Sinai and Palestine Campaign (1916–1919)
French Far East Expeditionary Corps: to French Indochina (1945–1956)
Greek Expeditionary Force to Korea (1950–1958)
Indian Expeditionary Force (1914–1918)
Italian Expeditionary Force: French and British in Italy (1917–1918)
Italian Expeditionary Corps in Russia (1941–1945)
Japanese Expeditionary Force to China (1939–1945)
Mediterranean Expeditionary Force (1915–1916)
New Zealand Expeditionary Force (1914–1918) and (1940–1945)
Samoan Expeditionary Force from New Zealand in World War I
Ottoman Hejaz Expeditionary Force (1916–1919)
Ottoman 1st Expeditionary Force (1914–1915)
Ottoman 5th Expeditionary Force (1914–1915)
Philippine Expeditionary Forces to Korea (1950–1955)
Portuguese Expeditionary Corps: to France and Belgium (1917–1918)
Russian Expeditionary Force in France (1916–1918)
UK Joint Expeditionary Force

Expeditionary warfare